v2food is an Australia-based producer of plant-based meat substitutes. It is a partnership between Jack Cowin's Competitive Foods Australia and CSIRO's investment fund Main Sequence Ventures. The company produces plant-based meat alternative products using protein extracted from legumes.

History

v2food was founded in January 2019 out of a partnership between Jack Cowin's Competitive Foods and CSIRO's investment fund Main Sequence Ventures. Jack Cowin's company also owns Hungry Jack's, the master franchisee of Burger King in Australia. CSIRO entered into an arrangement where the organization would generate research in exchange for an equity stake of the company. Founder Nick Hazell also serves as CEO of v2food.

Competitive Foods currently operates a facility in Brisbane. In 2019 the Australian Financial Review reported that a factory to supply v2food would break ground before the end of 2019. The factory will produce hamburger patties processed from grain legumes. The Wodonga factory is expected to open in 2021.

The company intends to expand its reach into China and other parts of Asia.

Products

Hungry Jack's launched v2food's first product in October 2019, the "Rebel Whopper", a meat-free alternative to the fast food company's signature Whopper burger. v2food's burger patties later became available at Soul Burger and Burger Urge outlets, as well as New Zealand Burger King restaurants from January 2020. In late 2020 Burger King launched the "Plant-Based Whopper" featuring v2food's patties in the Philippines and Japan.

In April 2020 v2food's mince product became available in meal kits from Marley Spoon. Their mince and burger patties became available in Woolworths and Coles supermarkets later that same year. The company released a sausage product in 2021.

See also 

 List of meat substitutes

References

External links 
 www.v2food.com

Food and drink companies established in 2019
Food manufacturers of Australia
Australian companies established in 2019
Meat substitutes
Vegetarian companies and establishments